Yantacaw, or Yanticaw may refer to the following in the U.S. state of New Jersey:

Yantacaw Brook, a tributary of the Third River
Yantacaw Brook Park, New Jersey, in Montclair
Yantacaw Elementary School, in Nutley
Yanticaw Park, a county park in Nutley